Thunderbird, thunder bird or thunderbirds may refer to:

 Thunderbird (mythology), a legendary creature in certain North American indigenous peoples' history and culture
 Ford Thunderbird, a car

Birds
 Dromornithidae, extinct flightless birds known as thunder birds 
 Genyornis, extinct flightless birds known as thunder birds

Arts, entertainment and media

Fictional characters
 Thunderbird, a creature in the game Zelda II: The Adventure of Link
 Thunderbird (James Proudstar), later known as Warpath, a Marvel Comics superhero introduced in 1984
 Thunderbird (John Proudstar), a Marvel Comics superhero introduced in 1975
 Thunderbird (Neal Shaara), a Marvel Comics superhero introduced in 2000

Film and television 
 Thunder Birds (1942 film), an American World War II propaganda film
 Thunderbirds (1952 film), an American war film
 Thunderbirds (TV series), a 1960s British puppet science-fiction series
 Thunderbirds (2004 film), based on the TV series
 Thunderbird (2022 film), a South Korean film

Music 
 Gibson Thunderbird, a bass guitar

Bands
 The Fabulous Thunderbirds, American blues rock band
 The Thunderbirds, 1960s English band of Chris Farlowe
 The Thunderbirds, 1960s Hong Kong band of [[Robert Lee Jun-fai]

Albums
 Thunderbird (Cassandra Wilson album), 2006
 Thunderbird (Louis Bellson album), 1965
 Thunderbird (Willis Jackson album), 1962

Songs
Chronological
 "Thunderbird", by ZZ Top from Fandango!, 1975
 "Thunderbird", by Quiet Riot from Metal Health, 1983
 "Thunderbird", by Iron Savior from Condition Red, 2002
 "Thunderbirds" / "3AM", a single by Busted, 2004
 "Thunderbird", by They Might Be Giants from The Spine, 2004
 "Thunderbird", by Seasick Steve from I Started Out with Nothin and I Still Got Most of It Left, 2008
 "Thunderbird" (Call Me No One song), 2012
 "Thunderbird", by C418 from Excursions, 2018

Video games
 Thunderbirds (2000 video game), a Game Boy Color video game
 Thunderbirds (2004 video game), a Game Boy Advance video game

Businesses and organisations

Hotels and motels 
 Thunderbird Hotel, now El Rancho Hotel and Casino, Paradise, Nevada, U.S.
 Thunderbird Motel, a former Indian-themed motel in Minnesota, U.S.
 Thunderbird Motel, one of the Miami modern architecture buildings, Florida, U.S.
 Thunderbird Motel, now a Standard Hotel on Sunset Strip, Los Angeles, U.S.

Schools 
 Thunderbird Adventist Academy, a high school in Scottsdale, Arizona, U.S.
 Thunderbird High School, Phoenix, Arizona, U.S.
 Thunderbird School of Global Management, at Arizona State University, U.S.

Other businesses and organisations
 Thunderbird Entertainment, a Canadian company

Computing
 Athlon Thunderbird, a microprocessor by AMD
 Mozilla Thunderbird, an e-mail and news client

Military
 45th Infantry Brigade Combat Team (United States), nicknamed Thunderbird
 No. 426 Thunderbird Squadron, of the Royal Canadian Air Force 
 Thunderbird (aircraft), a surviving B-17 painted to replicate a high mission-tally B-17 of World War II
 Thunderbird (missile), a British Army missile in service circa 1959–1977
 Thunderbird Field No. 1 and Thunderbird Field No. 2, World War II airfields in Arizona, U.S.
 United States Air Force Thunderbirds, an air demonstration squadron

Places
 Lake Thunderbird, Norman, Oklahoma, U.S.
 Thunderbird Archaeological District, Virginia, U.S.
 Thunderbird Glacier, Glacier National Park, Montana, U.S.
 Thunderbird Mountain, Glacier National Park, Montana, U.S.

Sports
 Adelaide Thunderbirds, an Australian netball team
 Albuquerque Thunderbirds, a former American basketball team
 Carolina Thunderbirds, a former American ice hockey team
 Carolina Thunderbirds (FPHL), an American ice hockey team
 Dubuque Thunderbirds, a former American junior hockey team
 Hamilton Thunderbirds, former name of a Canadian baseball team
Halifax Thunderbirds, a professional box lacrosse team in the National Lacrosse League
 Sault Thunderbirds, a 1959–1962 Canadian ice hockey team
 Seattle Thunderbirds, an American ice hockey team
 Soo Thunderbirds, a Canadian ice hockey team
 Southern Utah Thunderbirds, sports teams of Southern Utah University
 Springfield Thunderbirds, an American ice hockey team
 Thunderbird, nickname of Franco Wanyama (born 1968), Ugandan retired boxer
 Thunderbird Country Club, a golf course in Rancho Mirage, California, U.S.
 Thunderbird Soccer Club, a Taiwanese football club
 The Thunderbirds, organizers of the Phoenix Open golf tournament
 UBC Thunderbirds, the athletic teams of the University of British Columbia
 Thunderbird Stadium, a stadium located by the University of British Columbia's main campus

Transportation
 Royal Enfield Thunderbird, an Indian motorcycle
 Thunderbird, a British Rail Class 57/3 diesel rescue locomotive
 Thunderbird (train), a Japanese limited express
 Thunderbird 26, a class of sailboat
 Thunderbird Boats, a 60's boat manufacturer now known as Formula Boats
 Thunderbird W-14, three-seat biplane of the 1920s
 Triumph Thunderbird (disambiguation), the name of several British motorcycles

Other uses
 Thunderbird (Holiday World), a roller coaster in Santa Claus, Indiana, U.S.
 Thunderbird (PowerPark), a roller coaster at PowerPark, Alahärmä, Finland
 Thunderbird (wine), a flavored fortified wine

See also

 Thunderbird Lodge (disambiguation)
 Thunderbird Park (disambiguation)
 T-Bird (disambiguation)